Never Stop That Feeling is the debut album released by the German DJ, Mark 'Oh in 1995, by Peace Records.

Track listing

Album credits
All songs on Never Stop That Feeling are produced by Albrecht, Schöttler, Bokoe, Scheiker

Oh (Intro)
Written By: Albrecht, Schöttler
Love Song (Long Version)
Written By: Albrecht, Schöttler
Dreaming Of You (U.R.R.Mix)
Written By: Albrecht, Scheiker
Tears Don't Lie (Long Version)
Music By: Mark 'Oh, Dario Baldan Bembo, Ciro Dammicco
Words By: Mark 'Oh, Francesco Speccia, Alberto Salerno, Maurizio Seymandi
This song is a cover of "Soleado", also known as "When a Child is Born".
You Want More? (U.R.R.Mix)
Written By: Albrecht, Schöttler
Let's Do It Again
Written By: Albrecht, Schöttler
Can You Feel The Rhythm? (U.R.R.Mix)
Written By: Albrecht, Scheiker
Friendship (U.R.R.Mix)
Written By: Albrecht, Scheiker
How Do I Love You? (U.R.R.Mix)
Written By: Albrecht, Scheiker
Randy (Never Stop That Feeling) (Original Mix)
Written By: Albrecht, Gery Bokoe

References

1995 debut albums
Marko Albrecht albums